Budberg is the name of an old Baltic German noble family which originated from Westphalia, Germany. First documented since the beginning of the 14th century, members of the family held the title of Baron von Budberg-Bönninghausen in the Russian Empire, Sweden and Prussia.

Notable members 
Andreas Eberhard von Budberg  (1750–1812), Russian diplomat 
Karl Ludwig von Budberg (1775–1829), Russian general
Andrey Fedorovich von Budberg (1817–1881), Russian diplomat
Moura Budberg ( 1891–1974), Russian-British double spy
Peter Alekseevich Budberg (1903–1972), Russian-American sinologist